César Alfredo Velázquez Cuenca (born 16 September 1972 in Asunción, Paraguay), known as César Velázquez, is a Paraguayan former professional footballer who played as a goalkeeper for clubs in Paraguay, Argentina, Chile, Colombia, Honduras and Mexico.

Titles
 Independiente 1994 (Torneo Clausura)
 Nueva Chicago 2001 (Promoted a Primera División)

Notes

External links
 
 

1972 births
Living people
Association football goalkeepers
Paraguayan footballers
Paraguayan expatriate footballers
Paraguay international footballers
Club Sol de América footballers
Club Atlético Independiente footballers
Arsenal de Sarandí footballers
Unión Española footballers
Deportivo Cali footballers
Atlético Junior footballers
Nueva Chicago footballers
Cerro Porteño players
Argentinos Juniors footballers
C.D. Olimpia players
Quilmes Atlético Club footballers
C.F. Pachuca players
Estudiantes de Río Cuarto footballers
Club Atlético Douglas Haig players
Defensores de Belgrano footballers
Chilean Primera División players
Argentine Primera División players
Liga MX players
Expatriate footballers in Chile
Expatriate footballers in Argentina
Expatriate footballers in Colombia
Expatriate footballers in Honduras
Expatriate footballers in Mexico